Vannarpannai Navalar Maha Vidyalayam ( Vaṇṇārpaṇṇai Nāvalar Makā Vittiyālayam, also known as Vannai Navalar Secondary School) is a provincial school in Jaffna, Sri Lanka.

See also
 List of schools in Northern Province, Sri Lanka

References

Provincial schools in Sri Lanka
Schools in Jaffna